Pan Wenli (born ) was a  Chinese female volleyball player. She was part of the China women's national volleyball team.

She participated at the 1996 Summer Olympics, winning the silver medal. 
She also played at the 1994 FIVB Volleyball Women's World Championship in Brazil. 
On club level she played with Shanghai.

She was assistant coach at the University of Toronto.

Clubs
 Shanghai (1994)

References

External links
http://www.cev.lu/PlayerDetails.aspx?TeamID=1197&SeasonID=0&SeasonType=&G=&PlayerID=17669
http://www.gettyimages.com/detail/news-photo/july-3-2001-newly-immgrated-pan-wen-li-and-her-husband-zhu-news-photo/165449774#china1july-3-2001newly-immgrated-pan-wenli-and-her-husband-zhu-jiang-picture-id165449774
http://www.encyclopedia.com/women/dictionaries-thesauruses-pictures-and-press-releases/pan-wenli-1969

1969 births
Living people
Chinese women's volleyball players
Place of birth missing (living people)
Volleyball players at the 1996 Summer Olympics
Olympic volleyball players of China
Olympic silver medalists for China
Medalists at the 1996 Summer Olympics
Olympic medalists in volleyball
Asian Games medalists in volleyball
Volleyball players at the 1994 Asian Games
Medalists at the 1994 Asian Games
Asian Games silver medalists for China
Chinese expatriates in Canada
20th-century Chinese women